Barão de Monte Alto is a Brazilian municipality located in the state of Minas Gerais. Its population in 2020 was estimated to be 5,354 people living in a total area of 199.105 km². The city belongs to the mesoregion of Zona da Mata and to the microregion of Muriaé.

See also
 List of municipalities in Minas Gerais

References

Municipalities in Minas Gerais